The 2013 Chrono des Nations was the 32nd edition of the Chrono des Nations individual time trial cycle race and was held on 20 October 2013. The race started and finished in Les Herbiers. The race was won by Tony Martin.

General classification

References

2013
2013 in road cycling
2013 in French sport
October 2013 sports events in France